Boboc may refer to:

A village in Cochirleanca commune, Romania
A Romanian surname
Loredana Boboc,  Romanian gymnast
Radu Boboc (born 1999), Romanian professional footballer 
 Robert Boboc (born 1995), Romanian professional footballer
Valeriu Boboc, victim of police brutality in Moldova

Romanian-language surnames